Zygaenosia medialis is a moth in the subfamily Arctiinae. It was described by Max Gaede in 1925. It is found on New Guinea.

References

Nudariina
Moths described in 1925
Zygaenosia